Halmat is a village in Neelam Valley, Azad Kashmir, Pakistan.

References

2005 Kashmir earthquake
Populated places in Neelam District